The 2002 election was held on November 5. New York City Comptroller Alan Hevesi defeated former Assembly Minority Leader John Faso.

Democratic primary

Polling

General election

Polling

References

See also

Comptroller
2002
New York